Mentzelia torreyi is a species of flowering plant in the family Loasaceae known by the common name Torrey's blazingstar. It is native to the western United States where it grows in the Great Basin and surrounding areas in desert, scrub, woodland, and other habitat.

Description
It is a perennial herb growing in a small clump 10 to 16 centimeters high. The leaves are 2 to 4 centimeters long, sometimes divided into a few narrow lobes with rolled edges.

The inflorescence is a cluster of flowers each with yellow petals up to 1.5 centimeters long and many whiskery stamens each up to a centimeter in length. The fruit is an urn-shaped utricle containing many tiny bullet-shaped seeds.

External links
Jepson Manual Treatment
Photo gallery

torreyi
Flora of Nevada
Flora of the Great Basin
Flora of the California desert regions
Flora without expected TNC conservation status